Paddy Duncan (1894 – 9 April 1949) was an Irish footballer. At the 1924 Olympic Games he scored the Ireland (FAI)'s first ever goal in a senior international.

Club career
During his career Duncan was known by the nickname Dirty Duncan. Together with Charlie Dowdall, Thomas Murphy, Ernest McKay and Michael Farrell, Duncan was one of five players from St James's Gate, included in the Irish Free State squad for the 1924 Olympic Games.

Irish international
In 1924 Duncan made 4 appearances and scored 2 goals for the Irish Free State. The first two of these games were played at the 1924 Olympic Games. Other members of Olympic squad included Tommy Muldoon, Joe Kendrick, Jack McCarthy, Johnny Murray and Dinny Hannon. Duncan made his debut for the Free State in their first ever senior international on 28 May. He also scored the only goal in a 1–0 win at the Stade Olympique against Bulgaria. As a result of this win the Irish Free State qualified for the quarter-finals. On 2 June Duncan also played in this game against the Netherlands but the Irish Free State lost 2-1 after extra-time. 
The following day, before returning home, the team played Estonia in a friendly at the Stade Olympique and Duncan scored the opening goal in a 3–1 win.

On 14 June 1924 he also played against the United States in another 3–1 win at Dalymount Park. In March 1926 he travelled as a reserve with the Irish squad to play Italy, but did not play.

References

1894 births
1949 deaths
League of Ireland players
Footballers at the 1924 Summer Olympics
Irish association footballers (before 1923)
Olympic footballers of Ireland
Republic of Ireland association footballers
St James's Gate F.C. players
Association football forwards